Bjarne Hansen can refer to:

 Bjarne Hansen (art director), Danish art director
 Bjarne Hansen (footballer, born 1894) (1894–1915), Norwegian footballer
 Bjarne Hansen (footballer, born 1929) (1929–2023), Norwegian footballer

See also 
 Hansen (disambiguation)
 Hansen (surname)